Ophisma tropicalis is a moth of the family Noctuidae first described by Achille Guenée in 1852. It is found in tropical and subtropical America, from the south of the United States to Uruguay, including Brazil, Guadeloupe, Martinique, Saint Kitts, Montserrat, Saint Vincent, Grenada, the Greater Antilles, Cuba, the Dominican Republic, Jamaica and Colombia.

The larvae feed on Cupania americana.

References

External links
"Ophisma tropicalis". Moths of Jamaica. Retrieved December 4, 2019.

"Ophisma tropicalis Guenée, 1852". Catalogue of the Lepidoptera of the French Antilles. Retrieved December 4, 2019.

Ophiusina